Lunatic fringe is a term used to characterize members of a political or social movement as extremists with eccentric or fanatical views. Theodore Roosevelt is widely credited with having popularized the term, which he used with gusto:

"There is apt to be a lunatic fringe among the votaries of any forward movement."

"Then, among the wise and high-minded people who in self-respecting and genuine fashion strive earnestly for peace, there are foolish fanatics always to be found in such a movement and always discrediting it — the men who form the lunatic fringe in all reform movements."

It may refer to:

 "Lunatic Fringe" (song), a song by Red Rider from the 1981 album As Far as Siam
 LFNG, a gene in the Notch pathway
 "Lunatic Fringe", an episode of The Net (TV series)
 a screensaver that is part of the After Dark screensaver pack
 a nickname given to WWE wrestler Dean Ambrose
 a slogan for radio station WEBN
 a level in the video game Duke Nukem 3D